In cardiovascular physiology, end-diastolic volume (EDV) is the volume of blood in the right or left ventricle at end of filling in diastole which is amount of blood present in ventricle at the end of diastole
systole. Because greater EDVs cause greater distention of the ventricle, EDV is often used synonymously with preload, which refers to the length of the sarcomeres in cardiac muscle prior to contraction (systole). An increase in EDV increases the preload on the heart and, through the Frank-Starling mechanism of the heart, increases the amount of blood ejected from the ventricle during systole (stroke volume).


Sample values

The right ventricular end-diastolic volume (RVEDV) ranges between 100 and 160 mL. The right ventricular end-diastolic volume index (RVEDVI) is calculated by RVEDV/BSA and ranges between 60 and 100 mL/m2.

See also
 End-systolic volume
 Stroke volume

References

Cardiovascular physiology